Horia Moculescu (born 18 March 1937 in Râmnicu Vâlcea, Romania) is a self-taught Romanian pianist, composer, and producer.

After finishing high school in Turda, he studied at the Mining Institute in Petroșani. Throughout his career span, he played with many first-class Romanian musicians including Radu Goldiș. He has been married four times and has two children.

Compositions
Primăvara bobocilor (1985)
Vara sentimentală (1985)
Maria şi marea (1988)
Secretul armei... secrete (1988)
Miss Litoral (1990)

Film music
Pistruiatul (1973)
Nu filmăm să ne amuzăm (1974)

Distinctions
Marele Premiu al Uniunii Compozitorilor și Muzicologilor din România (2008) ("The Grand Prize of the Romanian Composers' Union")

References
Interview with him in a Romanian newspaper
Articles about him on Romanian TV website

Footnotes

Living people
1937 births
Romanian people of Italian descent